The 1965–66 season of the European Cup Winners' Cup club football tournament was won by Borussia Dortmund in an extra-time final victory over Liverpool at Hampden Park in Glasgow. This season of the Cup Winners' Cup was the first instance of the away goals rule being applied in football history.

First round

|}

First leg

Second leg

Știința Cluj won 3–0 on aggregate.

Dynamo Kyiv won 10–1 on aggregate.

Liverpool won 2–1 on aggregate.

CSKA Cherveno Zname won 4–1 on aggregate.

Second round

|}

First leg

Second leg

Atlético Madrid won 6–0 on aggregate.

Dynamo Kyiv won 6–1 on aggregate.

West Ham United won 6–2 on aggregate.

Borussia Dortmund won 5–4 on aggregate.

Quarter-finals

|}

First leg

Second leg

Celtic won 4–1 on aggregate.

West Ham United won 2–1 on aggregate.

Semi-finals

|}

First leg

Second leg

Borussia Dortmund won 5–2 on aggregate.

Liverpool won 2–1 on aggregate.

Final

See also
 1965–66 European Cup
 1965–66 Inter-Cities Fairs Cup

Notes

References

External links
 1965-66 competition at UEFA website 
 Cup Winners' Cup results at Rec.Sport.Soccer Statistics Foundation
 Cup Winners Cup Seasons 1965-66–results, protocols
 website Football Archive 1965–66 Cup Winners Cup 

2
UEFA Cup Winners' Cup seasons